The 1828 New Hampshire gubernatorial election was held on March 11, 1828.

Incumbent Jackson Governor Benjamin Pierce was defeated by Adams nominee John Bell.

General election

Candidates
John Bell, "Adams", sheriff of Rockingham County
Benjamin Pierce, "Jackson", incumbent Governor

Party labels were in flux following the splitting of the Democratic-Republican Party into groups following the 1824 presidential election. Contemporary newspapers refer to Pierce as a "friend of Andrew Jackson" and Bell as a "friend of John Quincy Adams" or "supporter of the Administration" although others suggested Pierce had won the support of many Adams supporters.

Results

Notes

References

1828
New Hampshire
Gubernatorial